Back on the Case is the fifth studio album by Acoustic Alchemy, released in 1991. The first four tracks all appear on the band's 2002 compilation album, The Very Best of Acoustic Alchemy. It is the second album by the band to feature pianist Terry Disley.

Track listing

Personnel 

Nick Webb - Steel String Guitars, Electric Guitar, and Sitar Guitar
Greg Carmichael - Nylon String Guitars, Steel String Guitar
Terry Disley - Keyboards
Mario Argandoña - Percussion, Handclaps
Patrick Bettison - Bass
Dan Tomlinson - Cymbals, Drums
Randy Brecker - Trumpet, Flugelhorn
Abe WHite - Bass (Track 9)
"Little" Terry Dee - Harmonica

References

Acoustic Alchemy albums
GRP Records albums
1991 albums